The 1993 African Cup Winners' Cup football club tournament was won by Al Ahly in two-legged final victory against Africa Sports. This was the nineteenth season that the tournament took place for the winners of each African country's domestic cup. Forty-one sides entered the competition, with Benfica and Diamond Stars withdrawing before the 1st leg of the preliminary round while NPA Anchors, Liverpool and Kabwe Warriors all disqualified by CAF during the first round.

Preliminary round

|}

First round

|}

Second round

|}

Quarter-finals

|}

Semi-finals

|}

Final

|}

External links
 Results available on CAF Official Website
 Results available on RSSSF

African Cup Winners' Cup
2